Kiełbasy  is a village in the administrative district of Gmina Rozogi, within Szczytno County, Warmian-Masurian Voivodeship, in northern Poland. 

Notable residents
 Willy Bachor (1921–2008), Wehrmacht soldier

References

Villages in Szczytno County